Parliamentary elections were held in Azerbaijan on 9 February 2020. They were originally scheduled to take place in November 2020, but were brought forward after parliament was dissolved in December 2019. Opposition parties accused President Ilham Aliyev of limiting their ability to campaign, and called for a boycott of the election.

The ruling New Azerbaijan Party retained its majority, winning 72 of the 125 seats, although this was later reduced to 70 when results in two constituencies were annulled. The second largest party (the Civic Solidarity Party) won only three seats.

Electoral system
The 125 members of the National Assembly were elected in single-member constituencies using the first-past-the-post system.

Campaign
A total of 1,314 candidates contested the elections; 1,057 ran as independents, with 246 running as candidates of 19 different parties and 11 as nominees of initiative groups.

Although a significant part of the opposition boycotted the elections, some parties (e.g. Musavat) announced that they would participate.

Results

The New Azerbaijan Party was initially reported to have won 72 seats, with 43 taken by independents. However, the results in four constituencies were later annulled by the Election Commission, with the New Azerbaijan Party and independents both losing two seats.

Erkin Gadirli of the Republican Alternative Party won a seat running as an independent.

Razi Nurullayev, the chairman of the spitter group from Azerbaijani Popular Front Party won a seat running as an independent.

Aftermath
The newly elected National Assembly met for the first time on 10 March and elected Sahiba Gafarova as Speaker.

References

Azerbaijan
Azerbaijan
Parliamentary election
February 2020 events in Asia
Parliamentary elections in Azerbaijan
Election and referendum articles with incomplete results